A zinc-ion battery or Zn-ion battery (abbreviated as ZIB) uses zinc ions (Zn2+) as the charge carriers. Specifically, ZIBs utilize Zn as the anode, Zn-intercalating materials as the cathode, and a Zn-containing electrolyte. Generally, the term zinc-ion battery is reserved for rechargeable (secondary) batteries, which are sometimes also referred to as rechargeable zinc metal batteries (RZMB). Thus, ZIBs are different than non-rechargeable (primary) batteries which use zinc, such as alkaline or zinc-carbon batteries.

History 
In 2011, Feiyu Kang's group showcased for the first time the reversible Zn-ion insertion into the tunnel structure of alpha-type manganese dioxide (MnO2) host used as the cathode in a ZIB.

The University of Waterloo in Canada owns patent rights to zinc-ion battery technology developed in its laboratories. The Canadian company Salient Energy is commercialising the zinc-ion battery technology.

Other forms of rechargeable zinc batteries are also being developed for stationary energy storage, although these are not explicitly zinc-ion. For example, Eos Energy Storage is developing a zinc-halide battery in which the cathode reaction involves the oxidation and reduction of halides. Eos Energy Storage is producing 1.5GWh of ‘Made in America’ zinc batteries to be used in the Texas and California electric grids.

Research

Motivation and issues 
Compared to lithium metal, a zinc negative electrode holds a higher theoretical volumetric capacity and natural abundance. Depending on the ZIB positive electrode, such theoretical advantages may also be present when comparing to lithium-ion batteries (LIBs). Moreover, zinc is more compatible with aqueous electrolytes. However, ZIBs generally show lower Coulombic (charge) efficiency than state of the art LIBs, larger overpotentials for plating and striping on the negative electrode, and the possibility of dendritic failure.

Chemistry 
Both aqueous and non-aqueous electrolytes are being investigated as candidates for ZIBs. Zinc salts using the TFSI or triflate anions have been considered for both aqueous and non-aqueous electrolytes. Zinc sulfate and alkaline KOH-based aqueous electrolytes have also been considered.

Until now, several cathode materials have been explored for ZIBs, including gamma-, delta-type MnO2, copper hexacyanoferrate, bismuth oxide, layer sulfides and Prussian blue analogues. For example, in 2017, researchers reported a prototype zinc-ion battery that has high reversibility, rate, and capacity without dendrite formation. The device used a zinc metal anode, a vanadium oxide cathode (Zn0.25V2O5⋅nH2O) and an aqueous electrolyte, all non-toxic materials. After 1,000 cycles it retained 80% of its capacity. The cell achieved a capacity up to 300  mAh g−1 and an energy density of ∼450  Wh l−1.

See also 
 List of battery types

References 

Rechargeable batteries